Greek Cypriots or Cypriot Greeks are the ethnic Greek population of Cyprus, forming the island's largest ethnolinguistic community. According to the 2011 census, 659,115 respondents recorded their ethnicity as Greek, forming almost 99% of the 667,398 Cypriot citizens and over 78% of the 840,407 total residents of the area controlled by the Republic of Cyprus. These figures do not include the 29,321 citizens of Greece residing in Cyprus, ethnic Greeks recorded as citizens of other countries, or the population of the Turkish-occupied Northern Cyprus.

The majority of Greek Cypriots are members of the Church of Cyprus, an autocephalous Greek Orthodox Church within the wider communion of Orthodox Christianity. In regard to the 1960 Constitution of Cyprus, the term also includes Maronites, Armenians, and Catholics of the Latin Church ("Latins"), who were given the option of being included in either the Greek or Turkish communities and voted to join the former due to a shared religion.

History

Prehistory and antiquity
Cyprus was part of the Mycenaean civilization with local production of Mycenaean vases dating to the Late Helladic III (1400–1050 BC). The quantity of this pottery concludes that there were numerous Mycenaean settlers, if not settlements, on the island. Archaeological evidence shows that Greek settlement began unsystematically in c. 1400 BC, then steadied (possibly due to Dorian invaders on the mainland) with definite settlements established in c. 1200 BC. The close connection between the Arcadian dialect and those of Pamphylia and Cyprus indicates that the migration came from Achaea. The Achaean tribe may have been an original population of the Peloponnese, Pamphylia, and Cyprus, living in the latter prior to the Dorian invasion, and not a subsequent immigrant group; the Doric elements in Arcadian are lacking in Cypriot. Achaeans settled among the old population, and founded Salamis. The epic Cypria, dating to the 7th century BC, may have originated in Cyprus.

Middle Ages
The Byzantine era profoundly molded Greek Cypriot culture. The Greek Orthodox Christian legacy bestowed on Greek Cypriots in this period would live on during the succeeding centuries of foreign domination. Because Cyprus was never the final goal of any external ambition, but simply fell under the domination of whichever power was dominant in the eastern Mediterranean, destroying its civilization was never a military objective or necessity.

The Cypriots did however endure the oppressive rule of first the Lusignans and then the Venetians from the 1190s through to 1570. King Amaury, who succeeded his brother Guy de Lusignan in 1194, was particularly intolerant of the Orthodox Church. Greek Cypriot land was appropriated for the Latin churches after they were established in the major towns on the island. In addition, tax collection was also part of the heavy oppressive attitude of the occupiers to the locals of the island, in that it was now being conducted by the Latin churches themselves.

Early modern period

The Ottoman conquest of Cyprus in 1571 replaced Venetian rule. Despite the inherent oppression of foreign subjugation, the period of Ottoman rule (1570–1878) had a limited impact on Greek Cypriot culture. The Ottomans tended to administer their multicultural empire with the help of their subject millets, or religious communities. The millet system allowed the Greek Cypriot community to survive, administered on behalf of Constantinople by the Archbishop of the Church of Cyprus. Cypriot Greeks were now able to take control of the land they had been working on for centuries. Although religiously tolerant, Ottoman rule was generally harsh and inefficient. The patriarch serving the Ottoman sultan acted as ethnarch, or leader of the Greek nation, and gained secular powers as a result of the gradual dysfunction of Ottoman rule, for instance in adjudicating justice and in the collection of taxes. Turkish settlers suffered alongside their Greek Cypriot neighbors, and the two groups together endured centuries of oppressive governance from Constantinople. A minority of Greek Cypriots converted to Islam during this period, and are sometimes referred to as "neo-Muslims" by historians.

Modern history
Politically, the concept of enosis – unification with the Greek "motherland" – became important to literate Greek Cypriots after Greece declared its independence from the Ottoman Empire in 1821. A movement for the realization of enosis gradually formed, in which the Church of Cyprus played a dominant role during the Cyprus dispute.

{{Quote box
|quote =
"Hellenism is a race as aged as the world,
Nobody could be found to eliminate it, 
Nobody, for it is protected from above by my God,
Hellenism will be lost, only when the world is gone."
|source = 'Archbishop Kyprianos' fictional response to Kucuk Mehmet's threat to execute the Greek Orthodox Christian bishops of Cyprus, in Vasilis Michaelides epic poem "The 9th of July of 1821 in Nicosia, Cyprus", written in 1884–1895. The poem is considered a key literary expression of Greek Cypriot Enosis sentiment.'|width = 24em
}}

During the period of British colonial rule (1878–1960), an efficient colonial administration was established, but government and education were administered along ethnic lines, accentuating differences. For example, the education system was organized with two Boards of Education, one Greek and one Turkish, controlled by Athens and Istanbul, respectively.  The resulting Greco-Turkish educational systems emphasized linguistic, religious, cultural, and ethnic differences and downplayed traditional ties between the two Cypriot communities.  The two groups were encouraged to view themselves as extensions of their respective motherlands, leading to the development of two distinct nationalities with antagonistic loyalties.

The importance of religion within the Greek Cypriot community was reinforced when the Archbishop of the Church of Cyprus, Makarios III, was elected the first president of the Republic of Cyprus in 1960. For the next decade and a half, enosis was a key issue for Greek Cypriots, and a key cause of events leading up to the 1974 coup, which prompted the Turkish invasion and occupation of the northern part of the island. Cyprus remains divided today, with the two communities almost completely separated. Many of those whom lost their homes, lands and possessions during the Turkish invasion, emigrated mainly to the UK, USA, Australia, South Africa and Europe, although most left Cyprus before 1974. There are today estimated to be 335,000 Greek Cypriot emigrants living in Great Britain. The majority of the Greek Cypriots in Great Britain currently live in England; there is an estimate of around 3,000 in Wales and 1,000 in Scotland.
By the early 1990s, Greek Cypriot society enjoyed a high standard of living. Economic modernization created a more flexible and open society and caused Greek Cypriots to share the concerns and hopes of other secularized West European societies. The Republic of Cyprus joined the European Union in 2004, officially representing the entire island, but suspended for the time being in Turkish-occupied northern Cyprus.

Population

 
 
Greeks in Cyprus number 659,115, according to the 2011 Cypriot census. There is a notable community of Cypriots and people of Cypriot descent in Greece. In Athens, the Greek Cypriot community numbers ca. 55,000 people. There is also a large Greek Cypriot diaspora, particularly in the United Kingdom.

Diaspora
 

Culture

Cuisine

Cypriot cuisine, as with other Greek cuisine, was imprinted with the spices and herbs made common as a result of extensive trade links within the Ottoman Empire. Names of many dishes came to reflect the sources of the ingredients from the many lands . Coffee houses pervasively spread throughout the island into all major towns and countless villages.

Language

The everyday language of Greek Cypriots is Cypriot Greek, a dialect of Modern Greek. It shares certain characteristics with varieties of Crete, the Dodecanese and Chios, as well as those of Asia Minor.

Greek Cypriots are generally educated in Standard Modern Greek, though they tend to speak it with an accent and preserve some Cypriot Greek grammar.

 Genetic studies 

A 2017 study, found that Cypriots belong to a wide and homogeneous genetic domain, along with the people of the Aegean Islands (including Crete), Sicily, and southern Italy (including the Greek-speaking minorities of Apulia and Calabria), while the continental part of Greece, including Peloponnesus, appears as slightly differentiated, by clustering with the other Southern Balkan populations of Albania and Kosovo. The study calls this distinct genetic domain, the "Mediterranean genetic continuum".

A 2017 study, found that both Greek Cypriots' and Turkish Cypriots' patrilineal ancestry derives primarily from a single pre-Ottoman local gene pool. The frequency of total haplotypes shared between Greek and Turkish Cypriots is 7-8%, with analysis showing that none of these being found in Turkey, thus not supporting a Turkish origin for the shared haplotypes. No shared haplotypes were observed between Greek Cypriots and mainland Turkish populations, while total haplotypes shared between Turkish Cypriots and mainland Turks was 3%. Both Cypriot groups show close genetic affinity to Calabrian (southern Italy) and Lebanese patrilineages. The study states that the genetic affinity between Calabrians and Cypriots can be explained as a result of a common ancient Greek (Achaean) genetic contribution, while Lebanese affinity can be explained through several migrations that took place from coastal Levant to Cyprus from the Neolithic (early farmers), the Iron Age (Phoenicians), and the Middle Ages (Maronites and other Levantine settlers during the Frankish era). The authors note however that the Calabrian samples used in the analysis were relatively small (n = 30 comparative dataset, n = 74 YHRD) and thus these results should be interpreted with caution. Furthermore, from the Greek sub-populations, Cretan Greeks were found to be the closest to Cypriots. In terms of Rst pairwise genetic differences, which indicate deeper shared paternal ancestry than shared haplotypes, Greeks appear genetically close to Cypriots, and equidistant from Greek and Turkish Cypriots. Both Greek and Turkish Cypriots have similar frequencies for their major patrilineal haplogroups, with the main subclades for both being J2a-M410 (23.8% and 20.3% resp.), E-M78 (12.8% and 13.9% resp.) and G2-P287 (12.5% and 13.7% resp.). The biggest differentiating characteristic between Greek Cypriots and mainland Greeks is the low frequency of haplogroups I, R1a, and R1b among the former, while the biggest differentiating characteristic between Greek Cypriots and Middle Easterners is the much lower frequency of haplogroup J1 among the former. Greek Cypriots are also differentiated by Turkish Cypriots in some aspects; namely Turkish Cypriots have 5.6% Eastern Eurasian (likely Central Asian/Turkic) and 2.1% North African patrilineal ancestry, while Greek Cypriots have 0.6% Eastern Eurasian and no North African patrilineal ancestry.

A 2017 archaeogenetics study, concluded that both the Mycenaean Greeks and the Minoans were genetically closely related, and that both are closely related, but not identical, to modern Greek populations. The FST between the sampled Bronze Age populations and present-day West Eurasians was estimated, finding that Mycenaeans are least differentiated from the populations of Greece, Cyprus, Albania, and Italy.

Notable people
 

Ancient
Acesas, Salaminian weaver
Apollodorus, Kitian physician
Apollonios of Kition, 1st century BCE physician of the Empiric school
 Clearchus of Soli, 4th–3rd century BCE Peripatetic philosopher
Demonax, 2nd CE Cynic philosopher
Evagoras I, king of Salamis 411–374 BCE
Evagoras II, king of Salamis 361–351 BCE
Nicocles, king of Paphos
Nicocles, king of Salamis 374/3–361 BC
Nikokreon, king of Salamis
Onesilus, king of Salamis 499–497 BC
 Paeon of Amathus, Hellenistic historian
 Persaeus, 3rd century BCE Stoic philosopher, student of Zeno
Pnytagoras, king of Salamis
 Stasanor, 4th century BCE general of Alexander the Great
Stasinos, poet, author of the epic poem Cypria
Synnesis of Cyprus, 4th century BCE physician
Zeno of Citium, 3rd century BCE philosopher, founder of the Stoic school of philosophy
 Zeno of Cyprus, 4th century CE physician

 Medieval 

 Epiphanius of Salamis, 4th century Bishop of Salamis
 Saint Spyridon, 4th century Bishop of Trimythous
 Saint Tychon, 4th century Bishop of Amathus
 Theodora, 6th century empress of the Eastern Roman Empire
 John the Merciful, 7th century Amathusian Patriatch of Alexandria
Neophytos of Cyprus, 13th century monk
 Leontios Machairas, 15th century historian
Georgios Boustronios, 15th century historian
 Ioannis Kigalas, 17th century scholar and professor

Modern

 Chris Tsangarides, Grammy-nominated record producer, sound engineer, and mixer of Greek Cypriot origin
 Cat Stevens, Greek Cypriot father
 Alkinoos Ioannidis, musician, born in Nicosia
 Andreas G. Orphanides, Professor of Archaeology, Rector & Composer
 Anna Vissi, singer, born in Larnaca
 Aristos Petrou, Cypriot-American rapper, one half of the rap duo Suicideboys
 Christopher A. Pissarides, Cypriot economist, Nobel laureate, born in Nicosia
 Anthony Skordi, actor
 Demetri Catrakilis, South African rugby union player
 George Kallis, Composer 
 George Michael, English singer-songwriter, Greek Cypriot father 
 George Eugeniou, founder and artistic director of Art Theatre, London 
 Georgios Grivas, military officer 
 George Young, Greek Cypriot mother 
 Grigoris Afxentiou, guerrilla fighter 
 Kypros Nicolaides, Professor in Fetal Medicine at King's College Hospital, London
 Kyriakos Charalambides
 Lambros Lambrou (footballer) 
 Lambros Lambrou (skier)
 Makarios III, first President of Cyprus 
 Marcos Baghdatis, tennis player
 Michael Cacoyannis, cinema director
 Michalis Hatzigiannis, singer
 Mick Karn, musician
 Mihalis Violaris, singer
 Nico Yennaris
 Paul Stassino
 Sotiris Moustakas, actor
 Stelios Haji-Ioannou, entrepreneur
 Stel Pavlou, English writer, Greek Cypriot father
 Theo Paphitis
 Tio Ellinas
 Tonia Buxton
 Vasilis Michaelides, poet
 Vassilis Hatzipanagis, football player
 Roys Poyiadjis
 Grigoris Kastanos
 Demis Hassabis, artificial intelligence researcher, Greek Cypriot father
 Jamie Demetriou, comedian, actor, screenwriter
 Natasia Demetriou, comedian, actor, screenwriter

See also
 
 Cyprus–Greece relations
 Greek Cypriot diaspora
 Turkish Cypriots
 Greek Britons
 List of Cypriots
 Cappadocian Greeks
 Greeks in New Zealand

Notes

References

Sources

 Quataert, Donald The Ottoman Empire 1700–1922'' Cambridge University Press 
 Winbladh, M.-L., The Origins of The Cypriots. With Scientific Data of Archaeology and Genetics, Galeri Kultur Publishing, Lefkoşa 2020

External links
 Reassessing what we collect website – Greek Cypriot London History of Greek Cypriot London with objects and images
 Cyprus: Historical Setting 

Ethnic groups in Cyprus
Cyprus–Greece relations